The 1988 Holiday Bowl was a college football bowl game played December 30, 1988, in San Diego, California. It was part of the 1988 NCAA Division I-A football season. It featured the 12th ranked Oklahoma State Cowboys, and the 15th ranked Wyoming Cowboys.

Game summary
Running back Barry Sanders scored on a 33-yard touchdown run for Oklahoma State, as they took a 7–0 lead. He would finish the game with 222 yards rushing and 5 touchdowns. Wyoming answered when quarterback Randy Welniak scored on a 4-yard touchdown run tying the game at 7. That ended the 1st quarter of play. Sanders scored on a 2-yard touchdown run, giving Oklahoma State a 14–7 lead. Cary Blanchard kicked a 33-yard field goal giving OSU a 17-7 halftime lead.

In the third quarter, Mike Gundy fired a 12-yard touchdown pass to wide receiver Brent Parker, increasing OSU's lead to 24–7. Randy Welniak's 4-yard touchdown run cut the lead to 24–14. Sanders erupted for touchdown runs of 67, 1, and 10 yards as OSU took a 45–14 lead.

In the fourth quarter, Blanchard kicked a 19-yard field goal to make it 48–14. Mike Gundy's 25-yard pass to Hart Lee Dykes made it 55–14. A 5-yard rushing touchdown by backup quarterback Chris Smith made the final score Oklahoma State 62, Wyoming 14.

References

External links
New York Times summary of game

Holiday Bowl
Holiday Bowl
Oklahoma State Cowboys football bowl games
Wyoming Cowboys football bowl games
Holiday Bowl
December 1988 sports events in the United States